National Prize for Literature (Premio Nacional de Literatura de Cuba) is the national literature prize of Cuba. It has been given annually since 1983 and recognizes those writers who have enriched the legacy of Cuban literature. It has been called "the most important award of its kind" in Cuba. 

The award is granted by the Instituto Cubano del Libro (Cuban Book Institute part of the Ministry of Culture). The award was founded in 1982 by the Ministerio de Cultura (Ministry of Culture) of the Cuban government.

Winners
1983 Nicolás Guillén
1984 José Zacarías Tallet
1985 Félix Pita Rodríguez
1986 Eliseo Diego, José Soler Puig, José Antonio Portuondo (shared)
1987 Dulce María Loynaz
1988 Cintio Vitier, Dora Alonso (shared)
1989 Roberto Fernández Retamar
1990 Fina García Marruz
1991 Ángel Augier
1992 Abelardo Estorino
1993 Francisco de Oraá
1994 Miguel Barnet
1995 Jesús Orta Ruiz
1996 Pablo Armando Fernández
1997 Carilda Oliver Labra 
1998 Roberto Friol
1999 César López
2000 Antón Arrufat
2001 Nancy Morejón
2002 Lisandro Otero
2003 Reynaldo González
2004 Jaime Sarusky
2005 Graziella Pogolotti
2006 Leonardo Acosta
2007 Humberto Arenal
2008 Luis Marré
2009 Ambrosio Fornet
2010 Daniel Chavarría
2011 Nersys Felipe Herrera
2012 Leonardo Padura Fuentes
2013 Reina María Rodríguez
2014 Eduardo Rafael Heras León
2015 Rogelio Martínez Furé
2016 Margarita Mateo Palmer
2017 Luis Álvarez Álvarez
2018 Mirta Yáñez
2019 Lina de Feria Barrio 
2020 Eugenio Hernández Espinosa
2021 Julio Travieso Serrano

References

External links
Premio Nacional de Literatura, at EcuRed 
Premios Nacionales de Literatura Directorio 

Cuban literary awards
Awards established in 1982
1982 establishments in Cuba